Predmier is a village in the Bytča District in the Žilina Region of Slovakia. It has a population of 1,350.

Notable people
Jozef Ignác Bajza, author of the first novel written in Slovak

References

Villages and municipalities in Bytča District